Ambikeshwar railway station is a small railway station in Gwalior district, Madhya Pradesh. Its code is ABE. It serves Ambikeshwar village. The station consists of a single platform. The platform is not well sheltered. It lacks many facilities including water and sanitation.

The station lies on Gwalior Light Railway track which starts from Gwalior railway narrow-gauge station to Sheopur in Madhya Pradesh. The line was started in 1904 by Maharaja Madho Rao Scindia of Gwalior.

Major trains 
Some of the important trains that runs from Ambikeshwar are :

 Gwalior Sheopur NG Passenger 
 Sabalgarh Gwalior NG Passenger

References

Railway stations in Gwalior district
Jhansi railway division
Railway stations opened in 1904